The Battle of the Fetters was an engagement between Sparta and Arcadia c. 550 BCE, in which the Arcadians defeated the Spartans.

According to Herodotus, the Spartans consulted the Delphic Oracle before taking military action. They were told that they would not conquer all of Arcadia but it was possible for Tegea to fall, for the oracle would "give you Tegea to dance in with stamping feet and her fair plain to measure out the line". The Spartans misinterpreted this oracle, believing that it referred to them measuring out the line to split it into kleros (the land allocated to each Spartan citizen upon coming of age). They then marched to battle carrying rods with which to parcel out their soon-to-be-conquered land and chains (fetters) with which to shackle their soon-to-be-conquered Arcadian Helots. Instead, they themselves became prisoners of war and ended up wearing the very chains they had brought with them.

Sparta, still recoiling from the defeat at Hysiai and Messenian revolts, in need of more land and resources took to attacking Arcadian Tegea. Though few details are known today of the battle itself, the upset victory for Tegea is legendary. The fetters, the chains that the Spartans brought, were put on display for centuries to come in the temple of Athene Alea, in Tegea. Sparta's cocky attitude and Tegea's non-militaristic status was often remarked on by Herodotus, Greek historian of the time, saying the battle's failure for the Spartans and the shame that came with it inspired Sparta to further improve their military.

References 

the Fetters
Fetters
6th century BC in Greece
Ancient Arcadia